James Wilder may refer to:

 James A. Wilder (1868–1934), Hawaiian artist and scout
 James Wilder Sr. (born 1958), American former football running back in the NFL
 James Wilder Jr. (born 1992), American football running back in the CFL and NFL
 James Wilder (actor) (born 1968), American actor